Paul Friedrich Wolfskehl (30 June 1856 in Darmstadt – 13 September 1906 in Darmstadt), was a physician with an interest in mathematics. He bequeathed 100,000 marks (equivalent to 1,000,000 pounds in 1997 money) to the first person to prove Fermat's Last Theorem.

He was the younger of two sons of a banker, Joseph Carl Theodor Wolfskehl. His elder brother, the jurist Wilhelm Otto Wolfskehl, took over the family bank after the death of his father. From 1875 to 1880 Paul Wolfskehl studied medicine at the Universities of Leipzig, Tübingen and Heidelberg. In 1880 he received his doctorate from the Heidelberg University. At about this time, he began to suffer from multiple sclerosis, which eventually forced him to pursue another career. From 1880 to 1883 he studied mathematics at the universities of Bonn and Bern. In 1887 he habilitated at the Technische Hochschule Darmstadt and became a Privatdozent for mathematics at the university.

There are a number of theories concerning the prize's origin. The most romantic is that he was spurned by a young lady and decided to commit suicide, but was distracted by what he thought was an error in a paper by Ernst Kummer, who had detected a flaw in Augustin Cauchy's attempted proof of Fermat's famous problem.  This rekindled his will to live and, in gratitude, he established the prize. This story was traced by Philip Davis and William Chinn in their 1969 book 3.1416 and All That to renowned mathematician Alexander Ostrowski, who supposedly heard it from another, unidentified source. Another more prosaic story has it that Wolfskehl wanted to leave as little as possible to his shrewish wife. Yet another story, told in The Man Who Loved Only Numbers by Paul Hoffman, tells that Wolfskehl actually missed his supposed suicide time because he was in the library studying the Theorem. Upon realizing that, he concluded that the contemplation of mathematics was more rewarding than a beautiful woman so he decided not to kill himself. He bankrolled the Theorem because it "saved his life". On June 27, 1997, the prize was finally won by Andrew Wiles. By then, due in part to the hyperinflation Germany suffered after the end of World War I, the award had dwindled to £30,000.

The play From Abstraction by Robert Thorogood is based on the life of Wolfskehl. It was broadcast on BBC Radio 4 on 1 November 2006 and 29 August 2008.

See also
Andrew Beal, a Dallas banker who has offered $1,000,000 for a proof or disproof of Beal's conjecture
Wiles' proof of Fermat's Last Theorem
Millennium Prize Problems

Notes

References
 Ball, W. W. R. and Coxeter, H. S. M.,  Mathematical Recreations and Essays, 13th ed. New York: Dover, pp. 69–73, 1987. 
 Barner, K. "Paul Wolfskehl and the Wolfskehl Prize". Not. Amer. Math. Soc. 44, 1294–1303, 1997. 
 Hoffman, P., The Man Who Loved Only Numbers: The Story of Paul Erdos and the Search for Mathematical Truth, New York: Hyperion, pp. 193–199, 1998.

External links
Details about Wolfskehl from Simon Singh, author of the book Fermat's Last Theorem

1856 births
1906 deaths
19th-century German Jews
19th-century German mathematicians
German industrialists
Technische Universität Darmstadt alumni
Academic staff of Technische Universität Darmstadt
Heidelberg University alumni
20th-century German mathematicians
Scientists from Darmstadt